The Silent Hero is a 1927 American silent Western film directed by Duke Worne and starring Robert Frazer, Edna Murphy and Joseph W. Girard.

A man travels north to take part in the Alaska Gold Rush, leaving the woman he loves behind. A rival tries to win her over and later also claim jump on the hero's gold strike.

Cast
 Robert Frazer as Bud Taylor
 Edna Murphy as Mary Stoddard
 Ernest Hilliard as Wade Burton
 Joseph W. Girard as John Stoddard 
 Harry Allen as Blinky
 Napoleon the Dog as Phantom - the Dog

References

Bibliography
 Connelly, Robert B. The Silents: Silent Feature Films, 1910-36, Volume 40, Issue 2. December Press, 1998.

External links
 

1927 films
1927 Western (genre) films
1920s action films
American action films
1920s English-language films
Films directed by Duke Worne
Films set in Alaska
Rayart Pictures films
Silent American Western (genre) films
1920s American films
Silent action films